HMS Artifex was a repair ship of the Royal Navy from late in the Second World War and into the Cold War. 
Launched as the Cunard liner RMS Aurania she was requisitioned on the outbreak of war to serve as an armed merchant cruiser. Damaged by a U-boat while sailing with an Atlantic convoy, she was purchased outright and converted to a floating workshop, spending the rest of her life as a support ship for the navy.

Peacetime career
As one of the post-Great War "A-class" ocean liners, RMS Aurania was built by Swan Hunter and Wigham Richardson Ltd. at their Wallsend-on-Tyne yard for Cunard and launched on 6 February 1924. Her sisters included RMS Alaunia and RMS Ausonia. With the merger of Cunard and the White Star Line in 1933, she continued to serve with the resulting company, Cunard White Star Ltd.

War career
With war looming, she was requisitioned by the Admiralty on 30 August 1939 and converted to serve as an armed merchant cruiser, which involved the fitting of a number of guns. The conversion was completed on 2 October 1939. On completion of the work she entered service protecting trade sailing through the North Atlantic, covering the convoys. She was initially assigned to the Northern Patrol, followed by the Bermuda and Halifax Escort Force and then the North Atlantic Escort Force.

On 21 October 1941 she was sailing as an escort for convoy SL 89, bound from Halifax to the Clyde. At 04.28 hours he fired three torpedoes at her, two of them hitting the Aurania in the bow and under the bridge. The ship began to flood at the Number 3 hold, causing a list to port that eventually reached 25 degrees. The Auranias cargo of empty drums acted to keep her afloat, and the captain was able to reduce the list to 15 degrees and get underway again. Meanwhile, other convoy escorts had chased U-123 away from the scene. During the confusion a lifeboat had been launched containing six men, but it swamped upon hitting the water. One of the escorts, the Hunt class destroyer , picked up three of the men, but was unable to locate the others. Some hours later U-123 came across the sinking lifeboat, with a single survivor, and took him prisoner. Meanwhile, Aurania was escorted back to Rothesay Bay by the sloop , arriving on 23 October. The Germans claimed that she had been sunk.

She was laid up, spending the period between November 1941 and March 1942 with Plymouth Command. She was bought outright by the Admiralty on 24 March 1942 and selected for conversion to a Heavy Repair Ship. Work began that December and lasted until July 1944. She was commissioned in August as HMS Artifex and after carrying out trials was prepared for service in the Pacific theatre. She sailed to join the British Pacific Fleet in early 1945, and by March was being deployed out of Manus in the Admiralty Islands, supporting the ships of Task Force 57. Artifex took passage to Leyte on 19 April to support ships involved in the attacks against the airfields in the Sakishima-Gunto Islands. She remained here throughout April and much of May, sailing for Manus again on 20 May. She remained here for the rest of the war. On being released from the British Pacific Fleet in September she sailed back to Britain.

Postwar
Artifex was kept in commission after her return and was assigned to the training establishment  at Rosyth, which was used to train artificer apprentices. She remained here as a training ship until 1955, when she was paid off and reduced to the reserve. She continued to be based at Caledonia though as a tender. She was finally laid up at the Dockyard and placed on the disposal list. HMS Artifex was sold for scrapping to BISCO on 28 December 1960 and departed Rosyth under tow on 7 January 1961, bound for the shipbreakers at Spezia.

Notes

References

External links
 Cabin Liners: Cunard's "A"-Class Liners 1924

 

Aurania
World War II Auxiliary cruisers of the Royal Navy
Auxiliary ships of the Royal Navy
Ships built on the River Tyne
1924 ships
Ships built by Swan Hunter